Tracy (Trae) Pierce may refer to:

A member of The Blind Boys of Alabama
A case study in the documentary SiCKO